Pamela Wilson-Ryckman (born 1954) is an American artist who has lived and worked in San Francisco since 1999. Her work has been shown nationally and internationally in solo and group exhibitions in Chicago, New York, Oakland, San Francisco, Santa Fe, Madrid, Skarhamn and Seville. In 2009, she was awarded a Guggenheim Fellowship for Creative Arts and her watercolor series "Taking In" was featured in the San Francisco Arts Commission's Art on Market Street Kiosk Poster Program. Wilson-Ryckman is represented by Anglim Gilbert Gallery in San Francisco. In her first exhibition with Anglim in 2005, Glen Helfand writing for Artforum reported that Wilson-Ryckman "presented paintings and watercolors in which beauty emerged out of chaos." (March 2005)

Early life and education 
Pamela Wilson-Ryckman was born in New York, New York, in 1954. She earned a B.A. in fine arts from the University of California, Berkeley, in 1976 and an M.A. in art history, theory and criticism from The School of the Art Institute of Chicago in 1995.

Collections 
 San Francisco Museum of Modern Art
 J. Michael Bishop Art Collection at UCSF Mission Bay, San Francisco
 Civic Art Collection, San Francisco

Awards, grants and residencies 
 2009: John Simon Guggenheim Memorial Foundation Fellowship, Fine Arts
 2007: San Jose ICA, Artist in Residence - Printmaking facility, San Jose, California
 2003: Yaddo, Fellowship, New York
 1982: Ossabow Island Foundation, Fellowship, Georgia 
 1976: Eisner Foundation Award and Grant, University of California, Berkeley

References 

Living people
American artists
1954 births
University of California, Berkeley alumni
School of the Art Institute of Chicago alumni